Marylands is a Spanish-style country house on Pitch Hill, a rural part of Ewhurst, Surrey,  England. It is a Grade II* listed building, designed during 1929–31 by architect Oliver Hill. The gardens were planted by Gertrude Jekyll.

Architecture 
The house is made of Bargate stone sandstone with a green Swedish pantiled roof inspired by Spanish architecture and Lutyens. The two wings are linked by a stone terrace incorporating a Moorish curved pool, and the house has many stone and brick embellishments, such as fireplaces and window features. Servants' bells survive.

History 
The house was constructed by Oliver Hill between 1929 and 1931 for M. C. Warner. During World War II the house was let to Colonel Tatsumi, who served as Japanese Military Attaché to London, and Władysław Sikorski, the Polish prime minister of his government in exile.

In media 
The house was used as a filming location in Agatha Christie's Poirot in the episode Dead Man's Mirror.

References

Further reading 
 'Country Life' October 24, 1931
 'The Builder' January 24, 1928
 'The Ideal Home' June 1938
 BOE Surrey p227

Country houses in Surrey
Houses completed in 1931
Grade II* listed houses
Grade II* listed buildings in Surrey
Oliver Hill (architect) buildings
Gardens by Gertrude Jekyll